The Perez's frog (Pelophylax perezi), also known as Iberian waterfrog, Iberian green frog  or Coruna frog, is a species of frog in the family Ranidae. It is native to southern France, Portugal, Spain, and has been introduced to the Canary and Balearic Islands, Madeira, the United Kingdom, and the Azores. In the Iberian Peninsula it is widespread and common.

Its natural habitats are temperate forests, temperate shrubland, Mediterranean-type shrubby vegetation, rivers, intermittent rivers, swamps, freshwater lakes, intermittent freshwater lakes, freshwater marshes, intermittent freshwater marshes, sandy shores, arable land, and urban areas. It is not considered threatened by the IUCN.

See also 
 Hybridogenesis in water frogs

References

Pelophylax
Amphibians of Europe
Amphibians described in 1885
Taxonomy articles created by Polbot